Bakers Summit in Morrisons Cove is located in Bloomfield Township, Bedford County, Pennsylvania.  Founded in 1870 and formerly known as Bakersville, it changed its name to Bakers Summit in 1876, when the Bakers Summit Post Office was established.

Halter Creek originates near Bakers Summit.

External links
Morrisons Cove's Community Website - News and Information for Morrisons Cove, Pennsylvania

References

Populated places in Bedford County, Pennsylvania